The Airbus BelugaXL (A330-743L) is a large transport aircraft based on the Airbus A330-200F built by Airbus to replace the original Airbus Beluga to move oversized aircraft components, such as wings. The aircraft made its first flight on 19 July 2018, and received its type certification on 13 November 2019. The BelugaXL entered service with Airbus Transport on 9 January 2020.

Development
In 2013, the five original Belugas could not cope with production growth, and Airbus evaluated the Antonov An-124 and An-225, Boeing C-17 or Dreamlifter, and A400M, before choosing to modify one of its own aircraft. The programme was launched in November 2014 to build five aircraft to replace the existing five BelugaSTs; the design freeze was announced on 16 September 2015. The program cost is €1 billion for development and production.

Fleet

The original BelugaSTs were not to be withdrawn from service when the BelugaXL is introduced; a mixed fleet is to operate for at least five years, as the increased production rate of single-aisle aircraft requires the ability to move more parts.
The BelugaST fleet flew more than 8000 hours in 2017, doubled from 2014, but the five BelugaST aircraft are only halfway through their planned service life: another operator could use them for civil or military logistic applications.

The combined Beluga fleet was expected to rise to eight aircraft when three XLs are delivered, as the five originals stay in service before being withdrawn from 2021. The BelugaST fleet was reaching its limits, flying five times daily, and six days per week: 10,000 hours in 2017, while some parts are moved over land. Compared with the time required to move the parts of an A320, a BelugaST requires three times as much time to move the A330 parts and nine times as much for A350 parts.

After an Airbus A350 production increase, Airbus aimed to deliver 880 aircraft in 2019, and raise A320neo output to 63 per month by 2021; the BelugaXL fleet was expanded with a sixth example in June 2019. 
The BelugaSTs could still have 10–20 years' flying life left, and may be offered for sale or used to serve external customers.

Production
The aircraft's lower fuselage is assembled on the Airbus A330 final assembly line, and then moved to another facility for the year-long process of assembling the upper fuselage and the lowered nose fuselage. The first section arrived in Toulouse in November 2016. Final assembly started on 8 December 2016. The first large sections: one central and two lateral rear section panels, arrived on 12 April 2017 at the Toulouse Final Assembly facility (L34) from Aernnova's factory in Berantevilla, Spain.

Constructed by Airbus subsidiary Stelia Aerospace in Meaulte, its ,  nose section was delivered in May 2017.

In October 2017, 75% of the first BelugaXL structural assembly was done; with systems, mechanical, and electrical integration underway before integration of the tail elements, which had already been received. Its maiden flight was scheduled for summer 2018 before 10 months of flight tests necessary for its certification campaign, and a 2019 service entry. The second aircraft was to enter final assembly line in December 2018, and the three remaining each following year.

After mating the vertical fin, tail cone and horizontal stabiliser including the outboard vertical surfaces, the main freight door was to be attached from mid-November, before power-on at the end of 2017. The flight test campaign used a single, instrumented aircraft. The front cargo door was attached in December 2017. In January 2018, the second arrived in Toulouse for its transformation, in two months less after lessons learned from the first.

Testing

The first BelugaXL rolled off the assembly line on 4 January 2018, unpainted and without engines. Fewer than 1,000 flight test hours were planned for its certification campaign. After fitting its Rolls-Royce Trent 700 engines, it was ground tested for months to assess its systems operation, while bench tests in Toulouse and Hamburg, on flight simulators and in laboratories, simulated flight loads on full-scale copies of specific joints between the upper bubble and the lower fuselage, clearing the aircraft for flight, then type certification.

In March 2018, the first BelugaXL (MSN1824) was having its engines fitted, while the second (MSN1853) was 30% converted. After successful landing gear and flight-control system checks, MSN1824 was to be fuelled and ground tested. The third was expected to begin its conversion before the end of 2018. MSN1853 was to be first operational in 2019, after proving work in 11 European stations, while MSN1824 flight instrumentation was to be disassembled. It was rolled out with its Rolls-Royce Trent 700 engines but no winglets in April 2018.

It passed the ground vibration test in early June 2018, with Office National d'Etudes et de Recherches Aérospatiales (ONERA) and Deutsches Zentrum für Luft- und Raumfahrt (DLR) measuring its dynamic behaviour compared to flight envelope theoretical models. The flight-test programme was expected to last 600 hours. The second aircraft had its lower fuselage completed by mid-June, before upper shell structural work and freight door fitting after summer, for completion by September or October. The first flight was on 19 July 2018, from Blagnac, Toulouse, France. In February 2019, the first aircraft flew to various destinations, including Airbus's wing plants in Bremen, Germany and Broughton, Wales.

The first BelugaXL to enter service was the second aircraft built, which rolled out on 19 March 2019; the first test aircraft will be retro-fitted after certification.
The second aircraft (MSN1853) commenced flight-testing on 15 April, and by then, the first (MSN1824) had completed more than 140 test flights over 500 hours, the final stage before certification.
A third airframe was undergoing conversion, expected to last until the fourth quarter of 2019, for delivery in 2020. Operations were expected to start with two XLs in the second half of 2019.

After more than 200 flight tests over 700 hours, the BelugaXL received its European Aviation Safety Agency (EASA) type certification on 13 November 2019.

The last two BelugaXLs to be produced are expected to have 180-minute ETOPS approval, allowing them to be used for transatlantic flights, typically to transport satellites to North American launch sites. As of February 2021, tests were being conducted to gain approval for the XL's autoland capacity.

Operations

Airbus started operating the first BelugaXL on 9 January 2020; all six freighters are expected to be operating by the end of 2023, while the previous A300-600STs are to be phased out from 2021.

Design

With 30% more capacity than the original BelugaST, the BelugaXL can carry two A350 XWB wings instead of one. Its new fuselage is  longer and  wider than the original BelugaST, and it can lift a payload  heavier. Its aft section is based on the A330-300, while its forward is based on the A330-200 for centre of gravity reasons, and the reinforced floor and structure is derived from the A330-200 Freighter. The A330 wings, main landing-gear, central and aft fuselage form a semi-built platform with few systems, without the aft upper fuselage, while the upper central fuselage is cut off, facilitated by the metal construction.
The enlarged freight hold is mounted in three months with 8,000 new parts on the junction line.

Produced by Stelia Aerospace, its main freight door has 24 latches, and the nose includes the cockpit, while a four-seat courier section is supplied by Airbus. Its vertical stabiliser is 50% larger; it has auxiliary fins on the horizontal stabiliser, and two ventral fins beneath the empennage.

Deharde Aerospace and the P3 group provide the upper fuselage, while Aciturri produces the horizontal tail plane extension, auxiliary and ventral fins.

Specifications

See also

References

Notes

Further reading

BelugaXL
2010s international cargo aircraft
Airbus A330
Aircraft first flown in 2018
Twinjets